El-Sayed Lashin (born 9 February 1980 in Alexandria, Egypt) is an Egyptian table tennis player. His current club is Al Ahly in Cairo, where he resides. He qualified for his third Olympic Games  at the All Africa Games held in September 2011 in Maputo, Mozambique.

General Interest
Lashin has been playing table tennis since he was eleven years old. He initially only accompanied his brother but soon discovered that he liked playing. He holds a Bachelor's degree in Logistics from the Arab Academy for Science and Technology and Maritime Transport.

Career
Having made his international debut in 1997, Lashin competed for Egypt at several Continental Championships, All African Games and Olympic Games. He is a two times winner of the Francophone Games and a three times winner of the African Cup.

Career Records

African Championships
Men's Team: 2007 Brazzaville, 2004,Mauritius, 2002 Amman, 2000 Damascus, 1998 Port Louis, 1996 Nairobi

Men's Doubles: 2007 Brazzaville, 2004, Mauritius, 2002 Amman

Men's Singles:2007 Brazzaville, 2000 Damascus, 1998 Port Louis

Men's Doubles: 2000 Damascus, 1998 Port Louis

Mixed Doubles: 2004 Mauritius, 2000 Damascus

Men's Doubles: 1996 Nairobi

Mixed Doubles: 2007 Brazzaville, 1998 Port Louis

African Cup
2002 Johannesburg, 1999 Nairobi, 1998 Cairo

 2011 and 2009, Rabat

 2001 El Minia, 1997 Port Elizabeth

African Games
Men's Team: 2011 Malputo, 2007 Algeria

Men's Doubles: 2011 Malputo

Men's Team: 2003 Abuja, 1999 Johannesburg

Men's Singles: 2011 Malputo, 2003 Abuja, 1999 Johannesburg

Men's Doubles: 2007 Algeria, 2003 Abuja

Men's Singles: 2007 Algeria

Men's Doubles: 1999 Johannesburg

Mixed Doubles: 2011 Malputo, 1999 Johannesburg

Arab Championships
Men's Team: 2010 Um Al Hassam, 2008 Rabat, 2004 Bizerk, 2002 Amman, 2000 Damascus

Men's Doubles: 2002 Amman, 2000 Damascus

Mixed Doubles: 2002 Amman

Men's Singles: 2002 Amman

Mixed Doubles: 1998 Casablanca

Men's Singles: 2000 Damascus

Arab Cup
Men's Singles: 2007 Sanaa, 2003 Sanaa, 2001 Sussa

Men's Doubles: 2009 Cairo, 2007 Sanaa, 2005 Beirut, 2001 Sussa

Men's Singles: 2005 Beirut

ITTF Pro Tour
Winner Doubles: 2010 Morocco Open

SF Singles: 2010 Morocco Open, 2010 Egypt Open, 2009 Morocco Open

SF Doubles: 2011 Morocco Open

QF Singles: 2011 Morocco Open

QF Doubles: 2009 Kuwait Open, 1998 Lebanon Open

References

1980 births
Egyptian male table tennis players
Living people
Olympic table tennis players of Egypt
Table tennis players at the 2000 Summer Olympics
Table tennis players at the 2008 Summer Olympics
Table tennis players at the 2012 Summer Olympics
Arab Academy for Science, Technology & Maritime Transport alumni
Sportspeople from Alexandria
African Games gold medalists for Egypt
African Games medalists in table tennis
African Games silver medalists for Egypt
African Games bronze medalists for Egypt
Competitors at the 1999 All-Africa Games
Competitors at the 2003 All-Africa Games
Competitors at the 2007 All-Africa Games
Competitors at the 2011 All-Africa Games
Competitors at the 2015 African Games